The 6th Los Angeles Film Critics Association Awards, honoring the best filmmaking of 1980, were announced on 20 December 1980 and given on 9 January 1981.

Winners
Best Picture:
Raging Bull
Best Director:
Roman Polanski – Tess
Runner-up: Richard Rush – The Stunt Man
Best Actor:
Robert De Niro – Raging Bull
Runner-up: John Hurt – The Elephant Man
Best Actress:
Sissy Spacek – Coal Miner's Daughter
Runner-up: Mary Tyler Moore – Ordinary People
Best Supporting Actor:
Timothy Hutton – Ordinary People
Runner-up: Joe Pesci – Raging Bull
Best Supporting Actress:
Mary Steenburgen – Melvin and Howard
Best Screenplay:
John Sayles – Return of the Secaucus 7
Best Cinematography:
Ghislain Cloquet and Geoffrey Unsworth – Tess
Best Music Score:
Ry Cooder – The Long Riders
Best Foreign Film:
The Tin Drum (Die Blechtrommel) • West Germany/France/Poland/Yugoslavia
Experimental/Independent Film/Video Award (tie):
Yvonne Rainer – Journeys from Berlin/1971 
Joel DeMott – Demon Lover Diary 
New Generation Award:
Carroll Ballard
Career Achievement Award:
Robert Mitchum

References

External links
6th Annual Los Angeles Film Critics Association Awards

1980
Los Angeles Film Critics Association Awards
Los Angeles Film Critics Association Awards
Los Angeles Film Critics Association Awards
Los Angeles Film Critics Association Awards